Grace Kujur (Hindi: ग्रेस कुजूर) (born 3 April 1949) is an Adivasi woman poet from Ranchi (Jharkhand). Born in the Oraon (Kurukh) family of Father Patrick Kujur and Mother Ruth Kerketta, Grace Kuzur was retired from the post of DG (Program) from Directorate General of All India Radio, New Delhi in 2008. Grace Kuzur started writing work since 1966. Her poems have been published in various literary magazines and newspapers, 'Hindustan', 'Aaj', 'Yudhrat Aam Admi', 'Aryavrat', 'Jharkhandi Bhasha Sahitya Sanskriti Akhra' etc. Her poems are included in many poem collections including 'Kalam Ugalti Aag' and 'Lokpriya Aadivasi Kavitayen'. No collections have been published so far. She also wrote radio dramas and comedies. Her play, 'Mahua Gira Aadhi Raat', is being discussed on witchcraft very popular.

References

1949 births
Living people
Poets from Jharkhand
Women writers from Jharkhand
People from Ranchi district
20th-century Indian poets
20th-century Indian women writers
Indian women poets
Adivasi writers
Adivasi women writers
Hindi-language writers